Walshaw is a surname that may refer to:

Glen Walshaw (born 1976), Zimbabwean athlete in swimming
Ken Walshaw  (1918–1979), English athlete in football
Lucas Walshaw (born 1992), English athlete in rugby
Tom Walshaw (1912–1998), English engineer, author, model engineering expert

See also
 Walshaw, a village in Greater Manchester, England
 Walshaw Dean Reservoirs, West Yorkshire, England